Alnaqiyah (also Romanized as ‘Alnaqīyah, Alanghiyeh, Alanqayah, ‘Alanqayeh, ‘Alīngīyeh, and ‘Alīnqayeh; also known as Alangir) is a village in Qaqazan-e Sharqi Rural District, in the Central District of Takestan County, Qazvin Province, Iran. At the 2006 census, its population was 252, in 71 families.

References 

Populated places in Takestan County